Verdi is an unincorporated community in Ottawa County, Kansas, United States.

History
Verdi was platted in 1884. It was named for the Italian composer Giuseppe Verdi.

The only post office in Verdi was discontinued in 1913.

Education
The community is served by Solomon USD 393 public school district.

References

Further reading

External links
 Ottawa County maps: Current, Historic, KDOT

Unincorporated communities in Ottawa County, Kansas
Unincorporated communities in Kansas
Populated places established in 1884
1884 establishments in Kansas
Giuseppe Verdi